The 2011–12 Russian Women's Football Championship was the 20th edition of the Russian premier championship for women's football teams. Like the 2011–12 Russian Premier League, it marked the competition's transition from its traditional spring to autumn model to the Western autumn to spring calendar, running from 16 April 2011 to 28 June 2012. It was contested by eight teams, one more than the previous edition, with Zorky Krasnogorsk and Mordovochka Saransk joining the championship. Defending champion WFC Rossiyanka won its fourth title with a 17 points advantage over newcomer Zorky, which also qualified for the UEFA Champions League as the runner-up. Five-times champion Energiya Voronezh withdrew from the championship following the end of the season for financial reasons.

Teams by federal subject

Table

Results

Top scorers

References

2011-12
2011–12 domestic women's association football leagues
2011–12 in Russian football leagues